Andrew Mark Smith (born 27 November 1968) is a retired Scottish footballer who played as a striker, and most recently was a temporary manager of Gretna with Mick Wadsworth.

Career
Born in Aberdeen and a product of the Scottish Highland Football League, Smith's first senior club was Huntly. He subsequently transferred to Peterhead within the Highland League, prior to moving to Airdrieonians in the Scottish Football League.

He briefly played in Canada with the Calgary Kickers of the Canadian Soccer League.

He scored Airdrie's goal in the 1992 Scottish Cup Final against Rangers after coming on as a substitute (an eventual 2–1 defeat), and subsequently played in the 1992–93 European Cup Winners' Cup against Sparta Prague. In November 1994, he again came off the bench to score in a cup final, this time the winner in a 3–2 extra-time victory over Dundee in the 1994 Scottish Challenge Cup Final, and at the end of that season appeared in the 1995 Scottish Cup Final versus Celtic, but the Diamonds also lost on that occasion.

Smith joined Dunfermline Athletic in 1995 for £70,000, breaking his leg on his debut in a pre-season friendly but recovering to score several times including the goal which confirmed the club's promotion to the Premier Division. During the Pars three-year spell in the top tier he scored 34 times, and in January 1998 he got five of his team's goals in a 7–2 Scottish Cup win over amateurs Edinburgh City.

He then had a spell at Kilmarnock, being brought in as cover for injured veteran Ally McCoist for a £150,000 transfer fee in January 2000 after a short loan period over the month prior, but he failed to make an impact during the rest of the season, scoring only once before McCoist returned and eventually was loaned to Ross County before being released, joining Raith Rovers in 2001. During his time in Kirkcaldy, the club were relegated but then won the Scottish Second Division championship.

Smith joined Clyde in summer 2003, and formed a good partnership with Ian Harty. Despite age catching up on him, Smith scored 10 league goals for the club, and almost won promotion to the Scottish Premier League, losing out to champions Inverness Caledonian Thistle by one point.

He then joined Gretna where he made a handful of appearances and helped them win the Scottish Third Division. He retired from playing in 2005, though remained at Gretna in a coaching role until the club folded in 2008.

Personal life
Smith had a role as a footballer in the 2000 film A Shot at Glory, which featured Robert Duvall, Michael Keaton and Ally McCoist. Smith's character scores for the fictional club Kilnockie in the Scottish Cup semi-final (against Kilmarnock, the team he and McCoist played for in real life at the time) to send them through to play Rangers at Hampden Park.

He settled in the west of Scotland and spent time working as a football development officer with both the Scottish Football Association and North Lanarkshire Council, until a dispute occurred with the local authority over wages paid.

Andy's son Jack is also a footballer and a striker, who trained as a youth with St Mirren and was playing for East Kilbride in the Lowland Football League (fifth tier) in 2016.

HonoursPeterheadHighland League: 1988–89AirdrieoniansScottish Challenge Cup: 1994–95
Scottish Cup: Runner-up 1991–92, 1994–95Dunfermline AthleticScottish First Division: 1995–96Raith RoversScottish Second Division: 2002–03Gretna'
Scottish Third Division: 2004–05

Individual
Airdrieonians Hall of Fame inductee

References

External links

Living people
1968 births
Scottish footballers
Footballers from Aberdeen
Scotland B international footballers
Huntly F.C. players
Peterhead F.C. players
Airdrieonians F.C. (1878) players
Dunfermline Athletic F.C. players
Kilmarnock F.C. players
Ross County F.C. players
Raith Rovers F.C. players
Clyde F.C. players
Gretna F.C. players
Scottish Premier League players
Scottish Football League players
Scottish football managers
Gretna F.C. managers
Highland Football League players
Association football forwards
Association football coaches
Calgary Kickers players